"Der gute Kamerad" ("The Good Comrade"), also known by its incipit as "Ich hatt' einen Kameraden" ("I had a comrade") is a traditional lament of the German armed forces. The text was written by German poet Ludwig Uhland in 1809. Its immediate inspiration was the deployment of Badener troops against the Tyrolean Rebellion. In 1825, the composer Friedrich Silcher set it to music, based on the tune of a Swiss folk song.

The song is about the immediate experience of a soldier losing a comrade in battle, detached from all political or national ideology; as a result, its use was never limited to one particular faction and was sung or cited by representatives of all political backgrounds throughout the 19th and 20th centuries, and was translated for use in numerous fighting forces, French, Dutch, Spanish, and Japanese amongst others.

Usage
Ernst Busch used the tune for his eponymous Spanish Civil War song about the death of Hans Beimler. German playwright Carl Zuckmayer in 1966 used the song's line "Als wär's ein Stück von mir" as the title for his autobiography (English title: A Part of Myself).

"The Good Comrade" still plays an important ceremonial role in the German armed forces and is an integral part of a military funeral, continuing a tradition started at some point around 1871.

The song has also become traditional in obsequies of the Military of Austria and the Austrian firebrigades. In the German-speaking Italian province of South Tyrol, the piece is played at funerals of volunteer firefighters and during remembrance ceremonies held by the Schützenbund. The Chilean Armed Forces and the National Army of Colombia also utilize it, though Chile does not exclusively use it for funerals or remembrance ceremonies. It is also used to some degree in the French Army, particularly in the Foreign Legion. When the song is played, soldiers are to salute, an honour otherwise reserved for national anthems only.

Occasionally the song is played at civil ceremonies, most often when the deceased had been affiliated with the military. It is also commonly sung at the funerals of members of a Studentenverbindung. The song is often played on Volkstrauertag, the German Remembrance Day, at memorials for the fallen.

Text

The above text is Uhland's original version. Various variants have been recorded over the years.

Heymann Steinthal in an 1880 article in Zeitschrift für Völkerpsychologie noted a variant he heard sung by a housemaid, "Die Kugel kam geflogen / Gilt sie mir? Gilt sie dir?" (i.e. " bullet came flying" instead of " bullet". Steinthal argued that this version was an improvement over Uhland's text, making reference to the concept of a "fateful bullet" in military tradition and giving a more immediate expression of the fear felt by the soldier in the line of fire.

Melody

References

Further reading
 Uli Otto, Eginhard König: Ich hatt' einen Kameraden..., Mainz 1999. (reviews) (in German)

External links

 Ich hatt' einen Kameraden , old recording by the French Foreign Legion (MP3 format)
 
 "Ich hatt' einen Kameraden ..." postcards, in German
 Translation into several languages, including English

1809 poems
1820s songs
German songs
Songs about the military
Songs about soldiers
Songs about friendship
Funerary and memorial compositions